The NS 5000 was a series of tank engines of Nederlandse Spoorwegen (NS) and its predecessor Maatschappij tot Exploitatie van Staatsspoorwegen (SS).

The SS ordered six tank engines for shunting work from the Beyer, Peacock and Company factory in Manchester, England. They were delivered in 1877 and 1878 with numbers 261-266. Later, the locomotives were used more and more for passenger services. Originally the cab was open, but at the start of World War I the cab was provided with lockable windows.

When the fleets of the HSM and the SS was merged into Nederlandse Spoorwegen in 1921, the locomotives were given the NS numbers 5001-5006. The locomotives were withdrawn between 1927 and 1935. No engines have been preserved.

Sources and references 

 

 

 

 

Rolling stock of the Netherlands
Beyer, Peacock locomotives
2-4-0 locomotives
Steam locomotives of the Netherlands
Nederlandse Spoorwegen locomotives
Standard gauge locomotives of the Netherlands
Maatschappij tot Exploitatie van Staatsspoorwegen